Leova District is a district in the central part of Moldova, bordering Romania, with the administrative center at Leova. As of 1 January 2011, its population was 53,800.

History
Localities with the oldest documentary attestation of the district are: Tigheci, Tochile Raducani, Leova, they are first attested in the years 1436-1489 period. In the 16th and 17th centuries, most of all to develop trade, agriculture and there is a significant population increase. During this period the Tirgul Sarata (Leova today), is developing intensively. In 1812, after the Russo-Turkish War (1806-1812), is the occupation of Basarabia, Russian Empire during this period (1812–1917), there is an intense russification of the native population. In 1918 after the collapse of the Russian Empire, Bessarabia united with Romania in this period (1918–1940, 1941–1944), the district is part of the Lăpușna County. In 1940 after Molotov-Ribbentrop Treaty, Basarabia is occupied by the USSR. In 1991 as a result of the proclamation of Independence of Moldova, part and residence of the Lapusna County (1991–2003), and in 2003 became administrative unit of Moldova.

Geography
Leova district is located in the southwest part of the Republic of Moldova. Neighborhood has the following districts: District Hincesti in north, east Gagauzia and Cimislia District, Cantemir District in southern and border state with Romania in west, on the river Prut. The relief is generally plain, but with altitudes above 250 m in the northern part of district (the southern extremity of Central Moldavian Plateau) in south elevations of 150–200 m (extreme north of Plateau Tigheci), and 20–100 m. the plains of Prut. Erosion processes with a medium intensity.

Climate
Temperate continental climate with an annual average district temperature +10+10.5 c. July average temperature +22 C, of January -4 C. Annual precipitation 450–550 mm. Average wind speed 3–6 m \ s.

Fauna
Typical European fauna, with the presence of such mammals such as foxes, hedgehogs, deer, wild boar, polecat, wild cat, ermine and others. Of birds: partridges, crows, eagles, starling, swallow and more.

Flora
Forests occupy 13.0% of the district are complemented by tree species such as oak, ash, hornbeam, linden, maple, walnut and others. From plants: wormwood, knotweed, fescue, nettle and many others.

Rivers
The main river is the Prut River, which crosses the western district in favor of Romania. Its main tributary of the Sarata River that crosses the district is. Most lakes are artificial origin.

Administrative subdivisions
Localities: 39
Administrative center: Leova
Cities: Iargara, Leova
Villages: 14
Communes: 23

Demographics

1 January 2012 the district population was 53,600 of which 29.1% urban and 70.9% rural population

Births (2010): 672 (12.5 per 1000)
Deaths (2010): 667 (12.4 per 1000)
Growth rate (2010): 5 (0.1 per 1000)

Ethnic groups 

Footnote: * There is an ongoing controversy regarding the ethnic identification of Moldovans and Romanians.

Religion 
Christians - 97.9%
Orthodox Christians - 97.0%
Protestant - 0.9%
Seventh-day Adventists - 0.6%
Evangelicals - 0.2%
Baptists - 0.1%
Other - 1.4%
No religion - 0.5%
Atheists - 0.2%

Economy
In the district are 11,859 total registered businesses.
The share of agricultural land is 57,071 ha (73.6%) of total land area. The arable land occupies 37 925 ha (48.9%) of the total agricultural land, of which 1229 ha plantation of orchards (1.6%), vines 4718 ha (6.1%), pasture 11,617 ha (15.0%), some 1582 ha (2.0%).

Education
In Leova district working 34 educational institutions, including:
Total number of students, including 7833 children in schools, in preschool institutions in 2009 children, 280 polyvalent vocational schools students.

Politics
Voters traditional in the district Leova, said mainly center-right parties, particularly the AEI. PCRM the last three elections is in a continuous fall.

During the last three elections AEI had an increase of 57.2%

Elections

|-
!style="background-color:#E9E9E9" align=center colspan="2" valign=center|Parties and coalitions
!style="background-color:#E9E9E9" align=right|Votes
!style="background-color:#E9E9E9" align=right|%
!style="background-color:#E9E9E9" align=right|+/−
|-
| 
|align=left|Party of Communists of the Republic of Moldova
|align="right"|8,171
|align="right"|35.79
|align="right"|−5.44
|-
| 
|align=left|Liberal Democratic Party of Moldova
|align="right"|6,561
|align="right"|28.74
|align="right"|+13.43
|-
| 
|align=left|Democratic Party of Moldova
|align="right"|4,290
|align="right"|18,79
|align="right"|+4.54
|-
|bgcolor=#0033cc|
|align=left|European Action Movement
|align="right"|1,364
|align="right"|5.97
|align="right"|+5.97
|-
| 
|align=left|Liberal Party
|align="right"|1,182
|align="right"|5.18
|align="right"|−5.81
|-
|bgcolor="grey"|
|align=left|Other Party
|align="right"|1,271
|align="right"|5.53
|align="right"|-12.69
|-
|align=left style="background-color:#E9E9E9" colspan="2"|Total (turnout 53.96%)
|width="30" align="right" style="background-color:#E9E9E9"|22,999
|width="30" align="right" style="background-color:#E9E9E9"|100.00
|width="30" align="right" style="background-color:#E9E9E9"|

Culture
In district works: two museums, artistic works 55, 14 bands, holding the title of the band - model, public libraries - 37.

Health
In district works: a hospital, the general fund of 190 beds, 1 center of family doctor's in the composition of which are 16 family physician offices, 7 health center's, 11 health points.

Tourism

The council of the Romanian Vaslui County, the county councils of the Moldovan Leova and Hînceşti districts, and the European Union (through the Phare program), have set up a program which seeks to promote tourism in these regions. The main tourist attractions of the Vaslui-Hînceşti-Leova touristic program are, among others, the medieval and early modern churches and monasteries, the Manuc Bei Hunting Palace and the Manuc - Mirzaian Manor Palace (similar to Manuc's Inn in Bucharest) in Hînceşti, as well as the region's natural riches.

 Trajan's Wall, who had started the course in the village of Filipeni, through Troita and follows the road to Cimislia. This monument dates back to the Trajan's Dacian Wars.
 The wooden church from Covurlui. This church is built of wood, was built in 1805, closed in 1959 and reopened in 1989.
 Monument of nature - tree secular. Oaks located in the city Leova, Street Gorghi 8, Hall Leova land owner. The tree is 214 years old.
 Church dedicated St. Voievozi, s. Michael and Gabriel in Borogani. The old church was built in 1811 of wood.

References

External links

 Descrierea generală a raionului Leova
 District population per year
 Rezultatele alegerilor din 28 noiembrie 2010 în raionul Leova

 
Districts of Moldova